Reverend Eleazer Wales was the first minister of the Kingston Presbyterian Church, in Kingston, New Jersey. He played a prominent role in the Presbyterian movement in and around Philadelphia. On May 26, 1738, the Synod of Philadelphia ordered the creation of the Presbytery of New Brunswick, and Reverend Wales played a prominent role in its formation.

References

Year of birth missing
Year of death missing
American Presbyterian ministers
18th-century American people
People of colonial New Jersey